Laura Spiranovic (born 18 November 1991) is an Australian soccer player who plays for Croatian Women's First Football League club ŽNK Split. She is the sister of fellow Australian soccer player Matthew Spiranovic.

Career
Spiranovic is a North Geelong Warriors junior. 

In October 2011, Spiranovic signed with Melbourne Victory for the 2011–12 W-League season. Her first appearance in the 2011–12 season came in a 2–0 victory against Perth Glory on 22 October, where she was substituted onto the field in the 74th minute.

In November 2015, Spiranovic was announced as new club Geelong Galaxy United FC's inaugural signing ahead of the 2016 Women's National Premier League season. 

In January 2019, Spiranovic signed for Croatian Women's First Football League club ŽNK Split.

Spiranovic is the only North Geelong Warriors player in history to win a top flight League title in Australia and overseas. She won the W-League with Melbourne Victory and the Croatian League with ZNK Split.

References

External links
 Melbourne Victory profile

Living people
Australian women's soccer players
Melbourne Victory FC players
1991 births
Women's association football forwards